Joedison Teixeira de Jesus (born 28 January 1994) is a Brazilian amateur boxer who won a bronze medal at the 2015 Pan American Games. He qualified for the 2016 Summer Olympics in the 69 kg division.

References

1994 births
Living people
Olympic boxers of Brazil
Boxers at the 2016 Summer Olympics
Brazilian male boxers
Pan American Games bronze medalists for Brazil
Boxers at the 2015 Pan American Games
Pan American Games medalists in boxing
Sportspeople from Salvador, Bahia
Light-welterweight boxers
Medalists at the 2015 Pan American Games
20th-century Brazilian people
21st-century Brazilian people